Machine-to-Machine Intelligence (M2Mi) Corp, based in the NASA Research Park in Moffett Federal Airfield, was founded in 2006 by Geoffrey Barnard (formally Geoffrey Brown ).

M2Mi is a founding member of the OASIS MQTT standards group and Geoffrey Barnard (Brown) served as the chair for the security sub-committee.

References

2006 establishments in the United States
Cloud computing providers
Companies based in California